This article contains a concise listing of individual systems of Chinese martial arts. Listings of various branches of a martial art system are located on a corresponding Wikipedia page which details the history of the system. The following list of Chinese martial arts is by no means exhaustive.

Alphabetical listing

 Babu Lian Huan Quan (8-step chained boxing)
 Ba Fa (Eight Methods)
 Ba Gua Zhang (Eight Trigrams Palm)
 Ba Ji (Eight Extremities)
 Bai Mei (White Eyebrow)
 Bei Tui (Northern Legs)
 Chang Quan (Long Fist)
Cha Quan
Chin Na
Chow Gar
Choy Gar
Choy Li Fut
 Chuo Jiao (Strike Foot)
DiSom 
Di Tang Quan
Drunken Monkey 
Drunken Fist
 Duan Quan (Short-range Fist)
Eagle Claw
 Emei Quan
 Fanzi (Rotating) 
 Feng Shou (Wind Hand)
Five Ancestors
Five Animals
Fujian White Crane 
Guzhuangquan
 Fu Jow Pai (Tiger Claw Style)
 Fut Gar (Buddhist Family)
 Hei Hu Quan (Black Tiger Fist)
 Hua Quan
Hung Fut
Hung Gar
Jow-Ga Kung Fu
Kong-Dao
 Kunlun Quan
Lai Tung Pai
 Leopard Style
 Li Gar Quan (Li Family Fist)
 Lian Huan Quan (Chained Punches)
 Luohan Quan (Arhat Fist)
 Mei Hua Quan (Plum-blossom Fist)
 Mian Quan (Cotton Fist) 
 Mi Zong 
Mok Gar
 Monkey Style
Nan Quan
Ng Ying (Five Animals)
 Northern Praying Mantis Style
Northern Shaolin
Pao Chui
 Pi Gua Quan (Chop-Hanging Fist)
Pushing hands
 San Da (Chinese Kick-boxing)
Shaolin Kung Fu
 Shuai Jiao (Chinese Wrestling)
 Shui Quan (Water Fist) 
 Snake Style
 Southern Dragon Style
 Southern Praying Mantis Style
Tai chi 
Tan Tui 
Tien Shan Pai
 Tong Bei Quan
Wing Chun
 Wu Dang Quan
Xing Yi Quan
Yau Kung Moon
 Yi Quan
 Yue Jia Quan
Zi Ran Men

See also
 List of martial arts

Chinese martial arts
Martial arts-related lists
Martial arts